Alina Briedelytė-Kavaliauskienė  (1942–1992) was a Lithuanian painter.

See also
List of Lithuanian painters

References
This article was initially translated from the Lithuanian Wikipedia.

1942 births
1992 deaths
20th-century Lithuanian painters